Frank Palmer Davies (1 August 1903–1970) was a Welsh footballer who played in the Football League for Bristol City, Charlton Athletic and Northampton Town.

References

1903 births
1970 deaths
Welsh footballers
Association football midfielders
English Football League players
Bath City F.C. players
Bristol City F.C. players
Charlton Athletic F.C. players
Portsmouth F.C. players
Nantwich Town F.C. players
Northampton Town F.C. players
Burton Town F.C. players